Arthur Henry Kenney (c.1776–1855)  was an Irish priest who was Dean of Achonry from 1812 to 1821.

He was educated at Trinity College Dublin, where he was elected a Scholar. He was the incumbent at Kilmacrennan before his years as Dean; and Rector of St Olave, Southwark afterwards.

He died in Boulogne on 27 January 1855.

References

External links

1855 deaths
Alumni of Trinity College Dublin
Deans of Achonry
Irish Anglicans
Scholars of Trinity College Dublin
Year of birth uncertain